Vishwamitri Dam, is an earthfill dam on Vishwamitri river near Patur in Akola district in the state of Maharashtra in India.

Specifications

Purpose
 Irrigation

See also
 Dams in Maharashtra
 List of reservoirs and dams in India

References

Dams in Akola district
Dams completed in 1996
1996 establishments in Maharashtra